Maureen Sullivan may refer to:

Maureen Sullivan (librarian)
Maureen Sullivan (The Sullivans)

See also
Maureen O'Sullivan (disambiguation)